Garraf is a small seaside village located between Sitges and Castelldefels, in the Garraf comarca, Catalonia, Spain, surrounded by the area of the Garraf Natural Park.

Description
Administratively Garraf belongs to the Sitges municipality. It was formerly a small fishing settlement, but has grown to become a holiday resort and its beach is full in the summertime. It also has a small RENFE railway station.

Garraf has a sports marina (Port del Garraf) which was originally built in 1902 as a harbor for freighters loading stone from the nearby limestone quarries.

Garraf has a small whitewashed church dedicated to the Virgin Mary. 
There is a house known as Celler Güell (Guell Winery) that was built by Antoni Gaudí. Presently it houses the premises of a restaurant.

Garraf village is quite picturesque, being located at the foot of the Garraf Massif, but the quarries nearby can mean a lot of dust is blown about on windy days in the fall and in the winter.

Transportation
Carretera C-31 (Les Costes del Garraf)
RENFE-Estació de Garraf

External links
 Ajuntament de Sitges
 Fotografia aèria del 1929, procedent del fons Gaspar de l'Institut Cartogràfic de Catalunya

Populated places in Garraf